Gare de Valognes is a railway station serving the town Valognes, Manche department, northwestern France. It is situated on the Mantes-la-Jolie–Cherbourg railway.

Services

The station is served by regional trains to Cherbourg, Caen and Paris.

References

External links
 

Railway stations in Manche
Railway stations in France opened in 1858